Fulldome refers to immersive dome-based video display environments. The dome, horizontal or tilted, is filled with real-time (interactive) or pre-rendered (linear) computer animations, live capture images, or composited environments.

Although the current technology emerged in the early-to-mid 1990s, fulldome environments have evolved from numerous influences, including immersive art and storytelling, with technological roots in domed architecture, planetariums, multi-projector film environments, flight simulation, and virtual reality.

Initial approaches to moving fulldome imagery used wide-angle lenses, both 35 and 70 mm film, but the expense and ungainly nature of the film medium prevented much progress; furthermore, film formats such as Omnimax did not cover the full two pi steradians of the dome surface, leaving a section of the dome blank (though, due to seating arrangements, that part of the dome was not seen by most viewers). Later approaches to fulldome utilized monochromatic vector graphics systems projected through a fisheye lens. Contemporary configurations employ raster video projectors, either singly or grouped together to cover the dome surface with full-color images and animations.

Newer emerging technologies being utilized include flexible curved LED displays currently being installed at the fulldome MSG Sphere with assistance from Industrial Light and Magic. They are working together with 360-degree content creators to create feature-length fulldome content utilizing 360 degree cameras including Red Digital Cinema.

Video technology 

Fulldome video projection can use a variety of technologies in two typical formats: single- and multiple-projector systems. The individual projector(s) can be driven by a variety of video sources, typically feeding material rendered in either real-time or pre-rendered modes. The result is a video image that covers an entire domed projection surface, yielding an immersive experience that fills a viewer's field of view.

Single- versus multiple-projector systems 

Single-projector fulldome video systems use a single (or mixed) video source displayed through a single fisheye lens, typically located at or near the center of a hemispherical projection surface. A single projector has the benefit of avoiding edge blends (see below) between multiple projectors. The main disadvantage of single fisheye systems is that they are limited to the resolution of one projector, and in the smallest dimension of the video image to cover a full dome. Another disadvantage of central projectors is the loss of the center of the dome for optimal viewing of the reconstructed perspective view provided by true hemispheric projection, a problem shared with traditional planetarium projectors. However, this disadvantage fades as audience size increases (everyone cannot be at the center of the dome anyway).

Single-projector mirror systems, pioneered by Mirrordome from Swinburne, but now offered by a plethora of manufacturers, are placed on the edge of the dome to increase seating, decrease costs, and to allow analog planetariums to become digital without giving up their star projector. It is also possible to build such a system at relatively low cost. The main disadvantage is noticeably lower projection quality compared to purpose-built lenses, despite being able to project a higher proportion of the projector resolution.

Multiple-projector fulldome video systems rely on two or more video projectors edge-blended to create a seamless image that covers a hemispherical projection surface; splitting the entire image up into segments allows for higher-resolution imagery and projector placement that does not intrude on the viewing area underneath the dome. A disadvantage of multiple projection is the need to frequently adjust the alignment of projectors and the uneven aging of separate projectors leading to brightness and color differences between segments. Even minor performance differences between projectors can be obvious when projecting a solid color across the entire scene. Edge blended areas where projectors overlap often have some smearing, double images, and can have very obvious additive black level areas if poorly designed or configured.

Common video projector technology 

A wide variety of video projection technologies has been employed in domes, including cathode ray tube (CRT), Digital Light Processing (DLP), liquid crystal display (LCD), liquid crystal on silicon (LCOS), and most recently, two varieties of laser projectors (see the laser video projector).

For multi-projector systems, in particular, display devices must have a low black level (i.e., project little or no light when no signal is sent to them) to allow for reasonable edge-blending between the different projector footprints. Otherwise, overlapping video images will have an additive effect, causing a complex pattern of grey to appear even when no image is being projected. This becomes particularly important for users in the planetarium field, who have a vested interest in projecting a dark night sky. The desire for projectors to “go to black” has resulted in continued use of CRT technology, even as newer and less expensive technologies have emerged.

LCD projectors have fundamental limits on their ability to project true black as well as light, which has tended to limit their use in planetariums. LCOS and modified LCOS projectors have improved on LCD contrast ratios while also eliminating the “screen door” effect of small gaps between LCD pixels. “Dark chip” DLP projectors improve on the standard DLP design and can offer a relatively inexpensive solution with bright images, but the black level requires physical baffling of the projectors. As the technology matures and reduces in price, laser projection looks promising for dome projection as it offers bright images, large dynamic range and a very wide color space.

DOME lenses and standard lens are similar in some ways. They both depend on the type of display device: LCD, DLP, LCOS, D-ILA, etc.; and the size chip or panel that is part of this device. The unique feature of the DOME lens is the actual shape of the glass, the projected image spill out from the top and all around the circumference of the lens. The biggest advantage is how this type of lens maintains focus over the full 180 x 180 field of view. A single standard flat field or curved field lens would have major focus and distortion issue. Several lens developers offer DOME lenses with each designed to a specific projector class and a display device. These lenses can cover a variety of pixel sizes and display resolutions.

Types of content 

360-degree and 180-degree content creator filmmakers are developing more and more refined feature-length ready fulldome films and virtual reality content every year. And computer graphic (CG) content is a source of material for fulldome, that can be live simulator output, such as from planetarium simulation software, or prerecorded fulldome video. Live-Action FullDome videos are becoming more available for dome use as digital video camera resolutions increase. Real Time content can also be displayed, referring to fulldome content that is not pre-rendered and generated using VJ software or game engines.

Notable films able to be displayed in the Fulldome format are Flesh and Sand by Academy Award winning director Alejandro González Iñárritu and three-time Academy Award-winning cinematographer Emmanuel Lubezki. The immersive film won a Special Achievement Academy Award by the Academy of Motion Picture Arts and Sciences.

Another notable film able to be displayed in the Fulldome format is The Protectors from Academy Award-winning director Kathryn Bigelow.

Other similar fulldome content is Avatar Flight of Passage.

History

See also 

 Virtual reality
 Flexible display
 LED display
 Academy of Motion Picture Arts and Sciences
 180-degree video
 360-degree video
 360 degree camera
 Curved screens
 High technology
 IMAX Corporation
 IMAX Dome
 Immersion (virtual reality)
 MSG Sphere
 Mixed reality
 Oculus
 Red Digital Cinema 
 Technology

References

Film and video technology
Visual arts media
Planetarium projection